David Huff or Dave Huff may refer to:

 David Huff (baseball) (born 1984), American pitcher
 David Huff (drummer) (born 1961), American drummer of White Heart and Giant
 David C. Huff (1936-2019), American politician and member of the Kansas House of Representatives
 David Huff, guitarist of David and the Giants, active 1960s
 David Huff, professor of geography and marketing, creator of the Huff model for retail trade analysis.

See also
David Hough (disambiguation)